Philip Christman House, also erroneously known as the Uhlrich Beidler House, is a historic home located at Washington Township, Berks County, Pennsylvania. It was built between 1730 and 1750, and is a -story, banked stone dwelling with a gable roof.  It is an example of regional Germanic architecture.

It was listed on the National Register of Historic Places in 1973.

References

Houses on the National Register of Historic Places in Pennsylvania
Houses completed in 1750
Houses in Berks County, Pennsylvania
National Register of Historic Places in Berks County, Pennsylvania